Mickey's Circus is an animated short film produced by Walt Disney Productions and released August 1, 1936. Known crew include director Ben Sharpsteen and animators Milt Kahl, Frank Thomas, Al Eugster, Shamus Culhane, and Errol Gray. It was the 87th Mickey Mouse short film to be released, the eighth of that year.

Although the film is called Mickey's Circus, the film mostly features Donald Duck; however, Mickey Mouse does feature in the beginning and end. Also featured are a trio of trained sea lions, a young sea lion pup, and an audience full of children.

Plot
Mickey Mouse is hosting a circus featuring Donald Duck and a trio of sea lions. Children from all over come to see the circus. After Mickey introduces the performers, the show starts. Donald enters the ring only to be stampeded by the sea lions and a young sea lion pup. The first act is juggling, in which the sea lions and Donald juggle balls that land on their noses. When the stunt is finished, the sea lions beg to be fed, throwing their balls at Donald and pointing to their mouths. Before Donald can feed the last sea lion, the pup intervenes and steals the fish. The resulting tug-of-war ends in the sea lions fighting over the fish. The next act is playing the organ pipe, but the sea lion can't do it right. The pup interferes and plays the tune "Yankee Doodle" instead, but the crowd cheers anyway. The pup distracts Donald to the point where Donald loses his temper, tries to attack the pup, and gets stuck in a drum. The next thing Donald knew, the whole crowd starts imitating him. Donald regains control, however, by driving the sea lions away from the basket of fish with his pistol.

Subsequently, the sea lions refuse to perform unless fed first. When Donald gets out a fish, the sea lion plays the tune rapidly. Again, the sea lions fight over the fish, destroying the organ pipe and ignoring Donald in the process. The pup steals the fish again and Donald chases; there follows a fast chase around the arena, which includes Donald chasing the pup through a cannon and Mickey attempting to intervene. The spectators fire the cannon, shooting Mickey and Donald out and resulting in Mickey landing on a tightrope and Donald hanging from a hook within the fish basket. When a spectator cuts Donald's basket loose, he falls, lands on a circus bike, yells "Get out! Get out of my way!" while ringing the bell frantically, and cycles across the tightrope toward Mickey (who somehow gets out of the way). The spectators oil the rope, causing Donald's bike to run backward and splatter Mickey, go over Mickey's pole, bounce back from the start, and end up on top of Mickey's pole. When the spectators throw a barrel at Mickey, Donald's bike is bounced off but Donald gets back by driving through thin air and Mickey is loaded on as well. The climax ensues when the spectators turn up the voltage to high, electrocuting Mickey and Donald and splitting the bike (and rope) in half, causing Mickey and Donald to fall. The two land in the seal tank, only to be hit by a fish thrown by the pup, and the film ends with the sea lions beating up Mickey and Donald as they fight over the fish in the tank as the camera irises out to the end card.

Production
In Hollywood Cartoons: American Animation in Its Golden Age, Michael Barrier discusses Mickey's Circus in a passage about stenographers' transcripts of Walt Disney in story meetings:

Although no animators were credited, it was reported that Milt Kahl, Woolie Reitherman, Bernard Wolf, Frank Thomas, Fred Spencer, James Culhane, Frank Kelling, Don Patterson, Cy Young, Larry Clemmons, Jack Hannah, Chuck Couch, Dick Williams, Al Eugster, Eddie Strickland, Jim Algar, Marvin Woodward, John McManus and Milt Schaffer have worked on this short. Emil Flohri and Carlos Manriquez are also noted to be the shorts background artists.

Voice cast
 Mickey Mouse: Walt Disney
 Donald Duck: Clarence Nash
 Salty the Seal: Pinto Colvig

Home media
The short was released on December 4, 2001, on Walt Disney Treasures: Mickey Mouse in Living Color.

See also 
 List of Disney animated shorts
 Mickey Mouse (film series)

References

External links 

 Mickey's Circus at disneyshorts.com

1936 films
1930s color films
Mickey Mouse short films
Donald Duck short films
1930s Disney animated short films
1936 animated films
Circus films
Films directed by Ben Sharpsteen
Films produced by Walt Disney
1930s American films